The 2016–17 season was Al Ahly's 58th season in the Egyptian Premier League and 58th consecutive season in the top flight of Egyptian football. The club participated in the Premier League, Egypt Cup, Super Cup, and the CAF Champions League.

Squad

Current squad

Transfers

Transfers in

Transfers out

Loans out

2016 Egyptian Super Cup

2016–17 Egyptian Premier League

Position

Results

Results by round

Match details

2017 Egypt Cup

Round 32

Round of 16

Quarter-final

Semi-final

Final

 Assistant referees:

 Fourth official:

2017 CAF Champions League

First round

Al Ahly won 1–0 on aggregate.

Group stage

Group D

2017 Arab Club Championship

Times listed are UTC+2

Group stage

Group A

Ranking of second-placed teams
The highest ranked second-placed team from the groups advanced to the knockout stage; the rest were eliminated.

Semi-final

References

Al Ahly SC seasons
Egyptian football clubs 2016–17 season